Ken Duken (born 17 April 1979) is a German actor and director.

Early life
Ken Duken is the third child of film and stage actress Christina Loeb; his father is a doctor. Duken never attended a drama school but took courses in drama, including under James Reynold. The actor initially played various theatre roles, including in such plays as Der Besuch der alten Dame (The visit of the old lady), Das Haus in Montevideo (The house in Montevideo) and in various Shakespeare plays. He debuted as a film actor in 1997, playing a small role in the television crime film Blutiger Ernst alongside Nadja Uhl and Daniel Brühl.

Career

Duken played his first major role on a movie screen in 1999, alongside Franka Potente and Heiner Lauterbach in Friedemann Fromm's  (Schlaraffenland). That same year he starred in Miguel Alexandre's drama Gran Paradiso, which was nominated for the German Film Award. For this film, in which he plays Mark, a young wheelchair user, he completed three months wheelchair-training. In 2005 his career continued in the cinema, with Buket Alakus's award-winning tragicomedy Offside.

Duken was a member of the cast in the core produced by ZDF since 2002 police drama series  by Lars Becker as a young Commissioner Teddy Schrader.

Also known is his portrayal of a Communist spy in the movie Karol - A Man Who Became Pope.

In the autumn of 2006 he was in Tolstoy's War and Peace by Robert Dornhelm in Russia and Lithuania, in which he played the role of Anatol Kuragin. The SWR teleplay Welcome home, Ken embodied in the war returnees Ben Winter, was shot mid-December 2007.

In 2003, together with Duken including Bernd Katzmarczyk and Norbert Kneissl worked with the production company Grand Hôtel Pictures. In its first work From another point of view he plays next to his wife Marisa Leonie Bach and Dominique Pinon. In 2009, he continued his own production number with the psycho-thriller Distance.

In addition to his work as an actor, Duken is now increasingly found behind the camera. For his film From another point of view, as well as several music videos, such as for Oomph! Rapper and the Curse, he has directed.

In 2008 Duken played the role of SS Captain Siegfried Fehmer, who was head of the Gestapo in 1945 in Oslo, in the film Max Manus on the Norwegian resistance fighters. The role of the smart ladies' man Fehmer, who could quickly change to a brutal torturer, was a good preparation for his performance in Quentin Tarantino's Inglourious Basterds (2009). Duken can be seen in chapter four of Inglourious Basterds as one of the cardplaying German soldiers. The card on his forehead reads Mata Hari.

In 2009 Duken played the character Ralf in Til Schweiger's film Zweiohrküken. In 2011 he starred in a BBC television drama called The Sinking of the Laconia (2011), in which he played Werner Hartenstein, commander of a German U-boat, and in the German TV movie  about the life of Carl and Bertha Benz. He also starred in the 2011 British film Chalet Girl.

In 2015, he directed the movie Berlin Falling. which eerily predicted a Berlin error attack that happened in December 2016.

In 2021, he starred in Algiers Confidential, as a Prince Harry lookalike.

Personal life

Since October 2000 Duken has been married to German actress Marisa Leonie Bach, a descendant of composer Johann Sebastian Bach. The couple has a son, Viggo (born October 2009).

Partial filmography

 (1999) - Laser
Gran Paradiso (2000) - Mark
Der Kanacke (2000) - Der Deutsche
100 Pro (2001) - Floh
 (2002) - Max
Nitschewo (2003) - Jim
 (2003–2008, TV series, 5 episodes) - Teddy Schrader
 (2004) - Adrian
Offside (2005) - Toni - Trainer
 (2006, Germany, TV Movie) - Klaus Störtebeker
Ali Baba et les 40 voleurs (2007, France, TV film) - Séraphin
War and Peace (2007, franco-italo-allemande, TV miniseries) - Anatole Kuragin
Resolution 819 (2008, France, TV film) - Thom Karremans
1½ Knights: In Search of the Ravishing Princess Herzelinde (2008) - Wärter
Max Manus (2008, Norway) - Kriminalrat Siegfried Fehmer
Distanz (2009) - Daniel Bauer
Inglourious Basterds (2009) - German Soldier / Mata Hari
Flight into the night – the accident at Überlingen (Überlingen mid-air collision) (2009, Germany, TV film) - Johann Lenders
World on fire (2009, USA) - Ian
Rabbit Without Ears 2 (2009, Germany) - Ralf
Kajínek (2010) - Bukovsky
The Sinking of the Laconia (RMS Laconia (1921)) (2011, Germany, TV miniseries) - Werner Hartenstein
Chalet Girl (2011, United Kingdom) - Mikki Nieminen
My Last Day Without You (2011, USA) - Niklas Henke
 (2011) - Carl Benz
A Day for a Miracle (2011, Germany, Austria, TV film) - Markus Höchstmann
On the Inside (2011) - Marco Held
One Last Game (2011) - Gellert
Die Männer der Emden (2012, Germany) - Karl Overbeck
Two Lives (2012) - Sven Solbach
 (2013, Germany, TV miniseries) - Julian Zimmermann
Robin Hood (2013) - Alexander Scholl
 (2013) - Kommissar Fischer
Frei (2014) - Dr. Viktor Voss
Northmen: A Viking Saga (2014) - Thorald
Romeo and Juliet (2014, TV series) - Mercutio
Coming In (2014) - Robert
Frau Müller muss weg! (2015, Germany) - Patrick Jeskow
Arletty, une passion coupable (2015, France, TV film) - Hans Jürgen Soehring
Treppe Aufwärts (2015) - Beyer
 (2016, Germany, TV film) - Adi Dassler
Conni & Co. (2016) - Jürgen Klawitter
The Lion Woman (2016) - Andrej
Conni & Co. 2 – Das Geheimnis des T-Rex (2017) - Jürgen Klawitter
Berlin Falling (2017, Germany) - Frank
Parfum (2018, Germany, TV series) - Roman Seliger
A Rose in Winter (2018) - Hans Lipps
Counterpart (2018–2019, TV series) - Spencer
Traumfabrik (2019) - Alex Hellberg
Vic the Viking and the Magic Sword (2019) - Leif (German version, voice)
Professionals (2020) (TV series) - Kurt Neumann  
Fate: The Winx Saga (2021) - Andreas

References

External links
 Ken Duken at his official website
 

Fate: The Winx Saga on IMDb

1979 births
Living people
German male film actors
German male television actors
German male stage actors
20th-century German male actors
21st-century German male actors